The 2023 Daniil Medvedev tennis season officially began on 1 January 2023, with the start of the Adelaide International.

Yearly summary

Early hard court season

Adelaide International

Australian Open

Sebastian Korda has knocked dual runner-up Daniil Medvedev out of the Australian Open with a dazzling straight-sets upset.

Rotterdam Open

Indian Wells Masters

Miami Open

Clay Court Season

All matches

This table chronicles all the matches of Daniil Medvedev in 2023.

Singles matches

Singles schedule

Yearly records

Head-to-head matchups
Daniil Medvedev has a  ATP match win–loss record in the 2023 season. Bold indicates player was ranked top 10 at the time of at least one meeting. The following list is ordered by number of wins:

  Félix Auger-Aliassime 2–0
  Alejandro Davidovich Fokina 2–0
  Matteo Arnaldi  1–0
  Liam Broady 1–0
  Alexander Bublik  1–0
  Borna Ćorić 1–0
  Grigor Dimitrov 1–0
  Marcos Giron 1–0
  Ilya Ivashka  1–0
  Miomir Kecmanović 1–0
  Karen Khachanov 1–0
  John Millman 1–0
  Andy Murray 1–0
  Brandon Nakashima 1–0
  Christopher O'Connell 1–0
  Andrey Rublev 1–0
  Lorenzo Sonego 1–0
  Botic van de Zandschulp 1–0
  Jannik Sinner 1–0
  Alexander Zverev 1–0
  Novak Djokovic 1–1
  Carlos Alcaraz 0–1
  Sebastian Korda 0–1

* Statistics correct .

Finals

Singles: 4 (3 titles, 1 runner-up)

Top 10 wins

Earnings
Bold font denotes tournament win

 Figures in United States dollars (USD) unless noted. 
source：2023 Singles Activity
source：2023 Doubles Activity

See also

 2023 ATP Tour
 2023 Rafael Nadal tennis season
 2023 Novak Djokovic tennis season
 2023 Carlos Alcaraz tennis season

Notes

References

External links 
 ATP tour profile

Medvedev
2023 in Russian sport